Adam Assimi is a Beninese middle-distance runner. He competed in the men's 800 metres at the 1980 Summer Olympics.

References

External links
 

Year of birth missing (living people)
Living people
Athletes (track and field) at the 1980 Summer Olympics
Beninese male middle-distance runners
Olympic athletes of Benin
Place of birth missing (living people)